Eastern Air Lines Flight 605 was a domestic flight in the US from Newark to Miami on May 30, 1947. The flight crashed near Bainbridge, Maryland, causing the deaths of all 53 passengers and crew on board in what was then the worst disaster in the history of North American commercial aviation.

Accident flight
Flight 605 departed from Newark International Airport at 17:04 for a scheduled domestic flight to Miami. While flying over Philadelphia, the pilot reported "all is well". All four crew and 49 passengers died in the crash. At the time, Flight 605 was the deadliest crash in United States aviation history.

Cause
The Civil Aviation Board's investigation of the crash determined that the probable cause of this accident was a sudden loss of control, for reasons unknown, resulting in a dive to the ground. 

In his book Fate Is the Hunter, Ernest K. Gann suggests that the crash was caused by unporting of the elevators due to a missing hinge bolt, Gann having narrowly avoided a similar fate himself on the same day.

Aircraft
The DC-4 aircraft, serial number 18380, was built in 1944 and was delivered officially as a C-54B Skymaster to the United States Air Force in October 1944. On the same day it was transferred with the designation R5D-2 to the United States Navy. It was leased to Eastern Air Lines on November 29, 1945 as fleet number 708.

References

External links
Report - Civil Aeronautics Board - PDF

Aviation accidents and incidents in the United States in 1947
Airliner accidents and incidents in Maryland
Airliner accidents and incidents with an unknown cause
Accidents and incidents involving the Douglas DC-4
605
1947 in Maryland
Cecil County, Maryland
May 1947 events in the United States